Lembi Vaher (born 11 February 1987) is an Estonian pole vaulter.

Her personal best is 4.09 metres, achieved in Kohila in June 2009.

Her indoor record is 4.22, achieved in February 2012, which was also a national record.

She is Estonian champion 2007−2010, 2012−2013.

References

1987 births
Living people
Estonian female pole vaulters
Athletes from Tallinn